"A Walk-On Part in the War" is a 1998 fantasy short story by Stephen Dedman.

Background
"A Walk-On Part in the War" was first published in Australia November 1998 in the Dreaming Down-Under anthology, edited by Jack Dann and Janeen Webb and published by Voyager Books. In 2004 it was republished in The Best Australian Science Fiction: A Fifty Year Collection, edited by Rob Gerrand and published by Black Inc. "A Walk-On Part in the War" won the 1998 Aurealis Award for best fantasy short story.

References

1998 short stories
Australian short stories
Fantasy short stories
Aurealis Award-winning works
Australian speculative fiction works